Sarah Walker (born 22 November 1989) is an English badminton player. She won the women's singles title at the English National Badminton Championships in 2013 and 2014.

Achievements

Commonwealth Games 
Women's doubles

European Championships 
Women's doubles

European Junior Championships 
Girls' doubles

BWF International Challenge/Series
Women's doubles

 BWF International Challenge tournament
 BWF International Series tournament

References

External links 
 
 
 Sarah Walker at Badminton England
 
 
 
 

1989 births
Living people
Sportspeople from Basildon
English female badminton players
Badminton players at the 2018 Commonwealth Games
Badminton players at the 2014 Commonwealth Games
Commonwealth Games silver medallists for England
Commonwealth Games bronze medallists for England
Commonwealth Games medallists in badminton
Medallists at the 2014 Commonwealth Games
Medallists at the 2018 Commonwealth Games